The Men's 4x100m relay T53-54 for wheelchair athletes at the 2004 Summer Paralympics were held in the Athens Olympic Stadium on 27 September. The event consisted of 3 heats and a final, and was won by the team representing .

1st round

Heat 1
27 Sept. 2004, 10:05

Heat 2
27 Sept. 2004, 10:15

Heat 3
27 Sept. 2004, 10:30

Final round

27 Sept. 2004, 21:35

Team Lists

References

M